The 2014 Wisconsin Badgers football team represented the University of Wisconsin–Madison in the 2014 NCAA Division I FBS football season. The Badgers were led by second-year head coach Gary Andersen, were members of the new West Division of the Big Ten Conference, and played their home games at Camp Randall Stadium. They finished the season 11–3, 7–1 in Big Ten play to be champions of the West Division. As champions of the West Division, they played East Division champions Ohio State in the Big Ten Championship Game where they lost 59-0.

Several days after the Big Ten Championship game in early December, head coach Gary Andersen stepped down to become the head coach at Oregon State of the Pac-12 Conference. Athletic director and former Badger head coach Barry Alvarez was the interim head coach for the Outback Bowl against Auburn, a 34–31 overtime victory on New Year's Day in Tampa, Florida.

Recruiting

Watchlists and preseason awards
Melvin Gordon
 Heisman Trophy
 Maxwell Award
 Doak Walker Award
 Walter Camp Award

Dan Voltz
 Rimington Trophy

Rob Havenstein
 Outland Trophy
 Lombardi Award

Derek Watt
 Allstate AFCA Good Works Team nominee

Schedule

Schedule Source:

Rankings

Regular season games

#13 LSU

The Badgers started off the regular season with a neutral site game against the LSU Tigers in Houston, Texas.

The game was McEvoy's debut as a Wisconsin quarterback. His 34.16 passer rating was the worst for a Wisconsin quarterback since 1977 when Mike Kalasmiki's debut passer rating was 5.20. After the game McEvoy stated that he was "disgusted" with his performance and that he "obviously had a bad game". Wisconsin's new starting kicker, freshman Rafael Gaglianone, made his first career field goal with a 51-yarder in the first quarter; his celebratory dance after making the kick was covered by some sporting news sites such as Bleacher Report.

During the game Wisconsin's defensive tackle Konrad Zagzebski and defensive end Warren Herring sustained injuries. Zagzebski was taken off the field in the 1st quarter in a stretcher and taken to memorial hospital. Herring injured his knee in the 3rd quarter.

Statistical Leaders
 Rushing: Melvin Gordon – 16 Carries, 147 Yards, 1 Touchdown
 Passing: Tanner McEvoy – 8 Completions/24 Attempts for 50 Yards, 0 Touchdowns, 2 Interceptions
 Receiving: Alex Erickson – 3 Receptions, 33 Yards
 Defense: Michael Caputo – 10 Solo & 10 Assist Tackles, 0 TFL 0 Sacks

Postgame injuries and miscommunications
After the game, it was announced that three players would be out for weeks due to injuries. Defensive end Warren Herring had surgery on his right knee and is projected to be out for up to six weeks. Fullback Derek Watt had surgery on his right foot and is project to be out for eight weeks.

Joel Stave
After the LSU game a press release by Wisconsin's head coach, Gary Andersen announced that Joel Stave didn't play due to what was initially called a shoulder injury and that Stave was out indefinitely. Stave's shoulder injury stems from the 2014 Capital One Bowl where Stave sustained an AC-joint injury. After Stave claimed he wasn't injured but was dealing with "yips" as he called them Andersen retracted his statement that Stave was injured but still said Stave was "out indefinitely". Stave summed up the situation with "Right now, my arm is just not working the way I'd like it to, I don't know what it is. ... I've thrown how many thousands of balls in my life. I know when it hurts and when it doesn't. It just isn't right." With Stave out sophomore Bart Houston moved up to the #2 quarterback position with true freshman DJ Gillins the #3 quarterback.

Melvin Gordon
Andersen was criticized for Gordon only having three carries in the second half; when asked why he didn't play Gordon more in the second half Andersen stated that he "didn't know why Gordon had limited carries". Gordon stated to the media after the game that he wasn't injured. However, two days later Andersen stated that Gordon strained his hip-flexor on the last play in the 2nd quarter of the game against LSU and "we were trying to be smart with him as the rest of the game went on". He cited the hip-flexor injury as the reason why Gordon "pulled up" on his 63-yard run early in the 3rd quarter. Gordon stated that it was a "miscommunication" with the coaching staff and that "maybe I should have really let them know, let coach A know and stepped up and told them, 'Look, I need to be in there.' I kind of just sat back, and I put that on myself. I wasn't really forceful with it. I really wasn't demanding with it, and I probably should have been."

After the game, it was announced that fullback Derek Watt, defensive end Warren Herring would be out for weeks.

Western Illinois

The Badgers made the quickest score in the history of college football. In the opening kickoff, the Leathernecks kick returner stepped out of the end zone before returning and taking a knee the end zone for a safety. One second had elapsed off the clock.

Statistical Leaders
 Rushing: Tanner McEvoy – 9 Carries, 55 Yards, 1 Touchdown
 Passing: Tanner McEvoy – 23 Completions/28 Attempts for 283 Yards, 3 Touchdowns, 1 Interceptions
 Receiving: Alex Erickson – 10 Receptions, 122 Yards, 1 Touchdown
 Defense: Marcus Trotter - 6 Solo Tackles

Bowling Green

Melvin Gordon set a personal best against Bowling Green, rushing 253 yards on 13 carries for five touchdowns. Gordon also recorded his first career fumble as the ball was stripped by a Bowling Green defender after 322 career carries. Gordon was named the Big Ten Player of the Week for his performance against Bowling Green; he shared the honor with Nebraska Halfback Ameer Abdullah.

Statistical Leaders
 Rushing: Melvin Gordon – 13 Carries, 253 Yards (19.5 avg, 69 long), 5 Touchdowns
 Passing: Tanner McEvoy – 9 Completions/16 Attempts for 112 Yards, 1 Touchdowns, 1 Interceptions
 Receiving: Sam Arneson – 3 Receptions, 63 Yards, 1 Touchdown
 Defense: Derek Landisch – 6 Total Tackles (3 Solo, 3 Assist), 3.5 Tackles for Loss (20 yds), 1 Pass breakup, 2 Sacks (18 yds)

South Florida

The game was the first time USF and Wisconsin had played one another. After a slow first half ending in USF and Wisconsin trading field goals Wisconsin exploded in the second half, scoring 24 points to USF's 7 resulting in a win for the Badgers.

Statistical Leaders
 Rushing: Melvin Gordon – 32 Carries, 181 Yards (5.7 avg, 43 long), 2 Touchdowns
 Passing: Tanner McEvoy – 11 Completions/18 Attempts for 160 Yards, 1 Touchdown
 Receiving: Alex Erickson – 6 Receptions, 91 Yards
 Defense: Sojourn Shelton – 5 Total Tackles (3 solo, 2 assist), 1 Pass Breakup

at Northwestern

Statistical Leaders
 Rushing: Melvin Gordon – 27 Carries, 259 Yards (9.6 avg, 61 long), 1 Touchdown
 Passing: Tanner McEvoy – 8 Completions/19 Attempts for 114 Yards, 1 Touchdown, 3 Interceptions
 Receiving: Alex Erickson – 4 Receptions, 45 Yards
 Defense: Michael Caputo – 11 Total tackles (8 Solo, 3 Assist), 1 Tackles for Loss (3 yds)

Illinois

Statistical Leaders
 Rushing: Melvin Gordon – 27 Carries, 175 Yards (6.5 avg, 46 long), 4 Touchdowns
 Passing: Joel Stave – 7 Completions/14 Attempts for 73 Yards
 Receiving: Sam Arneson – 4 Receptions, 48 Yards
 Defense: Leon Jacobs  – 12 Total Tackles (8 Solo, 4 Assist), 2 Tackles for Loss (11 yds), 1.5 Sacks (10 yds)

Maryland

Statistical Leaders
 Rushing: Melvin Gordon – 22 Carries, 123 Yards (5.5 avg, 22 long), 3 Touchdowns
 Passing: Joel Stave – 9 Completions/15 Attempts for 155 Yards, 2 Touchdowns
 Receiving: Alex Erickson – 5 Receptions, 121 Yards, 1 Touchdown
 Defense: Derek Landisch  – 8 Total Tackles (7 Solo, 1 Assist), 2 Tackles for Loss (6 yds)

at Rutgers

Wisconsin recorded its first road shutout since 1998 against the Scarlet Knights. Wisconsin's Defensive Coordinator, Dave Aranda was named Coordinator of the Week by Athlon Sports Wisconsin's runningback Corey Clement, a New Jersey native, was named Big Ten Offensive Player of the Week.

Statistical Leaders
 Rushing: Corey Clement – 14 Carries, 134 Yards (9.4 avg, 43 long), 2 Touchdowns
 Passing: Joel Stave – 7 Completions/16 Attempts for 81 Yards
 Receiving: George Rushing – 2 Receptions, 32 Yards
 Defense: Michael Caputo  – 7 Total Tackles (3 Solo, 4 Assist), 1 Tackle for Loss (1 yd)

at Purdue

Badgers Sophomore linebacker Vince Biegel was named Big Ten Defensive Player of the Week as a result of his performance against the Boilermakers.

Statistical Leaders
 Rushing: Melvin Gordon – 25 Carries, 209 Yards (8.2 avg, 47 long), 1 Touchdown
 Passing: Joel Stave – 19 Completions/29 Attempts for 219 Yards, 2 Touchdowns
 Receiving: Jordan Frederick – 5 Receptions, 64 Yards
 Defense: Vince Biegel – 7 Total Tackles (6 Solo, 1 Assist), 4 Tackles for Loss (22 yd), 3 Sacks (19 yds), 1 Pass Breakup

#11 Nebraska

Prior to the game it was announced by both the Nebraska and Wisconsin athletic departments that the two teams would now play for the Freedom Trophy. The game was referred to as a showdown between two Big Ten runningback Heisman Trophy candidates; Nebraska's Ameer Abdullah and Wisconsin's Melvin Gordon.

Through the 2014 season Nebraska was only allowing an average of 117.0 yards rushing per game against FBS opponents, ranked 15th in the nation; the Cornhuskers rushing offense was tenth in the country averaging 280.7 rushing yards per game. Wisconsin's defense was only allowing an average of 99.5 yards rushing per game, ranked 5th in the nation; the Badgers rushing offense were fifth in the country averaging 325.7 rushing yards per game.

The game started off with three costly turnovers for the Badgers quickly leading to the Cornhuskers being up 17–3 at the start of the second quarter, two of the turnovers were fumbles by Melvin Gordon. The Badgers then scored 56 unanswered points before Nebraska answered with a final touchdown at the end of the fourth quarter. The Badgers defense held Nebraska to just 180 total yards of offense for the game and managed to contain Ameer Abdullah to just 69 rushing yards on 18 attempts; meanwhile the Badgers offense totaled 627 yards of offense, 591 rushing and 46 passing. As a result, Wisconsin moved into first place in the Big Ten's West Division.

During the game Melvin Gordon set the FBS single game rushing record with 408 rushing yards. Gordon accomplished this, as well as scoring four rushing touchdowns, in only three quarters of play. The previous mark of 406 yards was set by LaDainian Tomlinson and had stood as a record since 1999. Along the way he also broke the Wisconsin Badgers single game rushing record of 339 yards, formerly held by Ron Dayne; the Big Ten single game rushing record of 377 yards by Indiana's Anthony Thompson. Gordon rushed for more than 39 yards on six plays. Prior to the matchup Nebraska's defense had only allowed three runs of more than 35 yards.

Two Badgers players were named Big Ten Player of the Week with Melvin Gordon being named offensive Player of the Week and Joe Schobert defensive Player of the Week.

Statistical Leaders
 Rushing: Melvin Gordon – 25 Carries, 408 Yards (16.3 avg, 68 long), 4 Touchdowns
 Passing: Joel Stave – 7 Completions/11 Attempts for 46 Yards, 1 Touchdown
 Receiving: Kenzel Doe – 2 Receptions, 16 Yards
 Defense: Joe Schobert - 11 Tackles, 2.5 TFL, 0.5 Sack, 1 Fumble recovery and Marcus Trotter - 12  Tackles, 1 TFL, 1 Sack, 1 Fumble recovery

at Iowa

At the end of the game Melvin Gordon tied the Big Ten and Wisconsin records for most rushing yards in a season (2,109) which was set by Wisconsin running back Ron Dayne in 1996. Also during the game Gordon became the fastest player to reach 2,000 yards rushing in FBS history, on 241 carries. The previous holder for fastest 2,000 yards was Penn State running back Larry Johnson who accomplished the feat on 251 carries in 2002. Gordon received his third Big Ten Offensive Player of the Week in the season.

Statistical Leaders
 Rushing: Melvin Gordon – 30 Carries, 200 Yards (6.5 avg, 88 long), 2 Touchdowns
 Passing: Joel Stave – 7 Completions/14 Attempts for 139 Yards
 Receiving: Melvin Gordon – 4 Receptions, 64 Yards (34 long)
 Defense: Michael Caputo - 11 Tackles, .5 TFL, 1 Forced fumble, 1 Fumble recovery, 1 Pass breakup

#22 Minnesota

The Battle for Paul Bunyan's Axe would decide the Big Ten's Western division representative to the 2014 Big Ten Football Championship Game. The last time the rivalry determined a Big Ten Conference champion was in 1962 when #3 Wisconsin defeated #5 Minnesota for a berth to the 1963 Rose Bowl.

Wisconsin would trail in this game 17–3 about halfway through the second quarter but 24 unanswered points by the Badgers put Wisconsin up 27–17 early in the fourth quarter. The Gophers would score a few minutes later to pull within three points but Wisconsin would answer on their ensuing drive and pull out a 34–24 come from behind victory. The victory gave Wisconsin the Big Ten West Division title and a spot in the Big Ten Championship Game against Ohio State. On Melvin Gordon's first carry of the game, he broke a tie with Ron Dayne for the Big Ten Conference and team single season rushing record. Gordon finished the game with 151 yards rushing and 2,260 yards on the season. Gordon now ranks fourth in FBS history for single season rushing yards behind only Oklahoma State's Barry Sanders (2,628 in 1988), UCF's Kevin Smith (2,567 in 2007) and USC's Marcus Allen (2,342 in 1981). Gordon needs to rush for a total of 369 yards in the final two games to break Barry Sanders' single season FBS rushing record.

Statistical Leaders
 Rushing: Melvin Gordon – 29 Carries, 151 Yards (5.2 avg, 24 long), 1 Touchdown
 Passing: Joel Stave – 11 Completions/18 Attempts for 215 Yards, 2 Touchdowns
 Receiving: Alex Erickson – 5 Receptions, 160 Yards
 Defense: Michael Caputo - 12 Tackles, 1 Forced fumble, 1 Fumble recovery

Big Ten Conference Championship

Wisconsin lost the 2014 Big Ten Championship to Ohio State 59–0 at Lucas Oil Stadium in Indianapolis, Indiana. It was the first time since 1997 that the Badgers were shutout and the worst loss since 1979 when Ohio State defeated the Badgers 59–0.

Statistical Leaders
 Rushing: Melvin Gordon – 26 carries, 76 yards (2.9 average, 13 longest)
 Passing: Joel Stave – 17 completions/43 attempts for 187 yards, 0 TD, 3 INT
 Receiving: Alex Erickson – 7 Receptions, 83 Yards
 Defense: Marcus Trotter – 10 tackles, 1 Tackle for loss

Outback Bowl

On December 7, it was announced that #19 Auburn and #18 Wisconsin would meet in the Outback Bowl. Auburn fired defensive coordinator Ellis Johnson prior to the game and it was announced that Charlie Harbison would be the interim defensive coordinator. Wisconsin's coach Gary Andersen left for Oregon State so the Badgers' athletic director Barry Alvarez coached the Badgers for the game. Prior to the game, the all-time series between the two schools was tied 1-1-1 and Wisconsin won the last meeting 28–14 in the 2006 Capital One Bowl.

Coaching staff

Roster

Big Ten Players of the Week
Week 4 - Offensive POTW - RB Melvin Gordon (shared with Nebraska RB Ameer Abdullah)
Week 10 - Offensive POTW - RB Corey Clement
Week 11 - Defensive POTW - LB Vince Biegel
Week 12 - Offensive POTW - RB Melvin Gordon, Defensive POTW - LB Joe Schobert
Week 13 - Offensive POTW - RB Melvin Gordon

Awards

 Sam Arneson
Honorable mention All-Big Ten (Media)
 Vince Biegel
Second team All-Big Ten (Media)
Honorable mention All-Big Ten (Coaches)
 Michael Caputo
Second team All-Big Ten (Consensus)
 Kyle Costigan
First team All-Big Ten (Consensus)
 Rafael Gaglianone
Honorable mention All-Big Ten (Coaches)
Honorable mention All-Big Ten (Media)
 Melvin Gordon
Doak Walker Award
Graham-George Offensive Player of the Year
Ameche-Dayne Running Back of the Year
First team All-America Team (Consensus)
First team All-Big Ten (Consensus)
 Rob Havenstein
First team All-Big Ten (Consensus)

 Darius Hillary
Second team All-Big Ten (Coaches)
Honorable mention All-Big Ten (Media)
 Derek Landisch
First team All-Big Ten (Coaches)
Second team All-Big Ten (Media)
 Dallas Lewallen
Honorable mention All-Big Ten (Coaches)
Honorable mention All-Big Ten (Media)
 Tyler Marz
Honorable mention All-Big Ten (Coaches)
Honorable mention All-Big Ten (Media)
 Joe Schobert
Honorable mention All-Big Ten (Coaches)
Honorable mention All-Big Ten (Media)
 Marcus Trotter
Honorable mention All-Big Ten (Coaches)
Honorable mention All-Big Ten (Media)
 Dan Voltz
Second team All-Big Ten (Media)
Honorable mention All-Big Ten (Coaches)

Team statistics
(as of November 30, 2014)

Passing
Note: G = Games played; COMP = Completions; ATT = Attempts; COMP % = Completion percentage; YDS = Passing yards; TD = Passing touchdowns; INT = Interceptions; EFF = Passing efficiency

Rushing
Note: G = Games played; ATT = Attempts; YDS = Yards; AVG = Average yard per carry; LG = Longest run; TD = Rushing touchdowns

Receiving
Note: G = Games played; REC = Receptions; YDS = Yards; AVG = Average yard per catch; LG = Longest catch; TD = Receiving touchdowns

Kick and punt returning
Note: G = Games played; PR = Punt returns; PYDS = Punt return yards; PLG = Punt return long; KR = Kick returns; KYDS = Kick return yards; KLG = Kick return long; TD = Total return touchdowns

Kicking
Note: G = Games played; FGM = Field goals made; FGA = Field goals attempted; LG = Field goal long; XPT = Extra points made; XPT ATT = XPT attempted; TP = Total points

Punting
Note: G = Games played; P = Punts; YDS = Yards; AVG = Average per punt; LG = Punt long; In20 = Punts inside the 20; TB = Touchbacks

Defensive
Note: G = Games played; Solo = Solo tackles; Ast = Assisted tackles; Total = Total tackles; TFL-Yds = Tackles for loss-yards lost; Sack–Yds = Sack(s)–yards lost; INT = Interceptions; PDef = Passes defended ; FF = Forced fumbles; FR = Forced recoveries

2015 NFL Draft

2015 NFL Draft class

Signed undrafted free agents
Kenzel Doe, WR, Pittsburgh Steelers
Warren Herring, DT, Atlanta Falcons

References

Wisconsin
Wisconsin Badgers football seasons
ReliaQuest Bowl champion seasons
Wisconsin Badgers football